Wajid Ali (born 1 September 2000) is an Indian cricketer. He made his first-class debut on 11 January 2020, for Uttar Pradesh in the 2019–20 Ranji Trophy.

References

External links
 

2000 births
Living people
Indian cricketers
Uttar Pradesh cricketers
Place of birth missing (living people)